The Sunbeam-Talbot 2 Litre is an automobile which was manufactured by Sunbeam-Talbot in the United Kingdom from 1939 until 1948. It was offered in 4-light sports saloon, foursome drophead coupé and 4-seater sports tourer body styles as well as a sports 2-seater. Production was suspended due to the Second World War and was resumed in 1945.

The 2 Litre utilised the styling  and chassis  of the Sunbeam-Talbot Ten with a wheelbase which was 3½ inches longer than the Ten. It was fitted with the 1944cc four cylinder sidevalve engine from the Hillman 14, that unit producing 52 bhp in its original form with improvements after the war increasing the power output to 56 bhp. The 2 Litre was fitted with Lockheed hydraulic brakes.

1,306 examples of the 2 Litre had been produced by 1948, in which year it was replaced by the Sunbeam-Talbot 90.

References

External links
 Sunbeam-Talbot brochures 1930 - 1940, www.car-brochures.eu

2 Litre
Cars introduced in 1938